The 2020–21 Bosnia and Herzegovina Football Cup was the 25th edition of Bosnia and Herzegovina's annual football cup, and the twentieth season of the unified competition.

Sarajevo were the defending champions since the 2019–20 edition was abandoned due to the ongoing COVID-19 pandemic in Bosnia and Herzegovina. Sarajevo managed to once again win the cup after beating Borac Banja Luka in the final.

Participating teams
The following teams took part in the 2020–21 Bosnia and Herzegovina Football Cup.

Roman number in brackets denote the level of respective league in Bosnian football league system

Calendar

Bracket

First round
Played on 30 September and 13 October 2020.

Second round
Played on 21 October and 14 November 2020.

Quarter-finals
Played on 10 March 2021.

Semi-finals
The first legs were played on 7 April, and the second legs were played on 21 April 2021.

Final
The final was played on 26 May 2021.

Details

References

External links
Football Association of Bosnia and Herzegovina
SportSport.ba

2020-21
2020–21 in Bosnia and Herzegovina football
2020–21 European domestic association football cups